Valentin Debise (born 12 February 1992) is a French motorcycle racer. He currently competes in the MotoAmerica Supersport Championship riding a Suzuki GSX-R600, and is a former winner of the French 125GP Championship, in 2008. He has also competed in the Supersport World Championship and the French Supersport Championship. He finished 2nd in the French Supersport Championship in 2013. Throughout the 2016 MotoAmerica Series, Debise and his teammates were coached by former AMA racer Ken Hill.

Career statistics

Grand Prix motorcycle racing

By season

Races by year
(key) (Races in bold indicate pole position, races in italics indicate fastest lap)

Supersport World Championship

Races by year
(key) (Races in bold indicate pole position; races in italics indicate fastest lap)

References

External links
 

125cc World Championship riders
250cc World Championship riders
Moto2 World Championship riders
Supersport World Championship riders
French motorcycle racers
1992 births
Living people
Superbike World Championship riders